Ciudad Universitaria may refer to:

Universities
University City of Buenos Aires, a complex housing two University of Buenos Aires faculties
University City of Caracas, the main campus of the Central University of Venezuela
University City of Madrid, a complex that houses Complutense University of Madrid and the Technical University of Madrid
University City of Mexico, the main campus of the National Autonomous University of Mexico
University City of the National University of San Marcos, the main campus of the National University of San Marcos, located in Lima

Places
Ciudad Universitaria (Madrid) barrio, Madrid

Transport
Ciudad Universitaria railway station, a station in Buenos Aires
Ciudad Universitaria station (Caracas), a station on the Caracas Metro
Ciudad Universitaria (Madrid Metro), a station on the Madrid Metro
Ciudad Universitaria (Mexico City Metrobús), a BRT station in Mexico City